Ashburn Alley is the open concourse behind center field at Citizens Bank Park, home of the Philadelphia Phillies. It is named after Hall of Famer Richie Ashburn, Phillies center fielder from 1948 to 1959, and was also a long time broadcaster for the Phillies from 1963 until his death in September 1997. Ashburn Alley spans from the left field gate to "The Yard" kids area, and features a "street-fair" like atmosphere before and during a game.

Ashburn Alley's name sake began while Ashburn was still playing. During the Phillies playing days at old Shibe Park, Ashburn was known for dropping bunts down the third baseline, which had slightly overgrown grass that helped the ball stay fair. A bronze statue of Ashburn lies in the center of the alley.

Features

Ashburn Alley serves as a history lesson of baseball in Philadelphia. Granite markers on the walk-way feature every Phillies all-star since the first game in 1933. Another feature of Ashburn Alley is Memory Lane. Memory Lane is located directly behind the batter's eye, and gives an extensive look at the history of Philadelphia baseball. It features the history of the Phillies, the history of Philadelphia Athletics, and history of Negro league teams in the city. At the end of the Memory Lane section offers a great view of the stadiums' two tiered bullpen. The upper bullpen, in particular, pulls snug against the concourse.

On the western end of the Alley is Bull's BBQ, named after former Phillies slugger Greg "The Bull" Luzinski, who also operates it. Bull's BBQ is an outdoor picnic section and serves barbecue pork sandwiches, chicken, and most notably ribs. Luzinski is at most of the games and often socializes with fans.

On top of the concession buildings in the center of the Alley is the Rooftop Bleachers. This area of the stadium was influenced by the old rooftop seats at the Phillies and Athletics old home Shibe Park. It was common during the 1920s for residents who lived in the rowhouses across from the ballpark to watch the games for free on their rooftops.

There are many concession stands featuring Philadelphia cuisine staples such as the cheesesteak, at both Tony Luke's and Campo's. The Alley also features the '47 Brand store, which sells classic Phillies apparel, classic pennants and banners, and other items.

References

Philadelphia Phillies
Sports in Philadelphia